Peschiera del Garda (Arilica) is a town and comune in the province of Verona, in Veneto, Italy.  When Lombardy-Venetia was under Austrian rule, Peschiera was the northwest anchor of the four fortified towns constituting the Quadrilatero. The fortress is on an island in the river Mincio at its outlet from Lake Garda.

The town is encircled by massive Venetian defensive systems that have been a UNESCO World Heritage Site since 9 July 2017.

History

Roman Ardelica was a town of Gallia Transpadana that occupied the site of the modern Peschiera del Garda, at the southeast angle of the Lacus Benacus (Lago di Garda), just where the Mincius (modern Mincio) issued from the lake. The name is found under the corrupted form Ariolica in the Tabula Peutingeriana, which correctly places it between Brixia and Verona; the true form is preserved by inscriptions, of which one says that it was a trading place, with a corporation of ship-owners, collegium naviculariorum Ardelicensium. (Orell. Inscr. 4108.) The town is mentioned as Arilica in Pliny the Elder's Naturalis Historia.

The fortress at Peschiera played a prominent part in most military campaigns conducted in northern Italy after 1400, especially during the Italian campaigns of the French Revolutionary Wars and the Napoleonic Wars. At the Battle of Peschiera fought on 6 August 1796, the day after the major French victory at the Battle of Castiglione, a French force commanded by general Masséna drove out the Austrians. After the Siege of Peschiera, during the First Italian War of Independence, it was taken by the Piedmontese from the Austrians, following a gallant defence by general Rath lasting six weeks, on 30 May, 1848.

During World War I, the Peschiera conference between the British and French premiers and the Italian king took place on 8 November 1917.

Peschiera del Garda was also known for its military jail, which closed in 2002.

The commune is part of the Associazione Città del vino ("Association of Wine Cities").

In winter, the nearby Laghetto del Frassino is the most important habitat for tufted ducks in Italy (Morbioli & Sighele 2006).

World heritage site
 
It is home to one or more prehistoric pile-dwelling (or stilt house) settlements that are part of the Prehistoric Pile dwellings around the Alps UNESCO World Heritage Site.
 location Belvedere ;
 location lake of Frassino ;

The fortress and the external fortifications. They were included in UNESCO's World Heritage Site list as part of "Venetian Works of Defence between the 16th and 17th centuries: Stato da Terra – western Stato da Mar" in 2017.

Main sights

Sanctuary of Madonna del Frassino (1511). It houses works by Paolo Farinati and Zeno da Verona.

Transport

Peschiera del Garda railway station, opened in 1854, forms part of the Milan–Venice railway.
The town is additionally served by ferry services, which connect it to other towns on the coast of Lake Garda, including Sirmione and Desenzano del Garda.

Gallery

Bounding communes

Castelnuovo del Garda
Valeggio sul Mincio
Ponti sul Mincio
Pozzolengo
Sirmione
Desenzano del Garda

Twin cities
Ula Tirso, Italy
Capoterra, Italy
Villa Carlos Paz, Argentina

See also 
Rocca di Manerba del Garda

References

  PDF fulltext

External links
Associazione Nazionale Città del Vino 

Cities and towns in Veneto
Roman towns and cities in Italy
Populated places on Lake Garda